Central African Republic–France relations are foreign relations between the Central African Republic (CAR) and France. Both nations are members of the Francophonie and the United Nations.

History

French Colonialism

During the Partition of Africa in the 1880s, Belgium, the German Empire and France each competed against each other in order to control territory north of the Ubangi River. In 1903, France named its new colony 'Ubangi-Shari' and in 1910, France incorporated the territory along with four other colonies (French Congo, Gabon, Chad and French Cameroon) into one colonial federation known as the French Equatorial Africa. Initially, the French government leased large parts of land for European companies and forced the local population to gather wild rubber, hunt for ivory and animal skins, and work on plantations. Due to forced exploitation by the French colonial empire, Central African locals began to rebel in the early 20th century. This led to the Kongo-Wara rebellion (1928-1931). The rebellion was soon suppressed by the French government.

During World War II, Central African soldiers formed part of the grand French colonial army (Troupes coloniales) and fought for Free France and partook in the Liberation of Paris. In October 1940, General Charles de Gaulle arrived to Bangui to visit Governor Pierre Marie de Saint-Mart and review the troops.

Independence
Soon after the second World War, France adopted a new constitution in 1946 and granted full French citizenship to residents of the Ubangi-Shari and allowed for the establishment of local assemblies within the new French Union. In December 1958, former Catholic Priest Barthélemy Boganda became head of government of the Ubangi-Shari Territory. In March 1959, Boganda's was killed when his airplane exploded and he was replaced by his cousin, David Dacko. On 13 August 1960, Ubangi-Shari obtained its independence from France and changed its name to the Central African Republic (CAR) and David Dacko became the country's first President.

Post Independence

20th century 
In December 1965, a coup d'état was launched against President Dacko known as the Saint-Sylvestre coup d'état (with the assistance of France) and Army Commander Jean-Bédel Bokassa declared himself President of CAR. In 1975, French President Valéry Giscard d'Estaing attended the France-Africa Summit held in Bangui. President Giscard was known to visit the country several times and partook in hunting expeditions with Bokassa. In December 1976, President Bokassa declared himself Emperor of the Central African Republic and his coronation amounted to approx. $20 million USD, which was equivalent to the GDP of the nation for an entire year. The French government paid for the Emperors coronation. D

Due to widespread repression, human rights abuse and allegations of cannibalism in CAR by Emperor Bokassa, France removed Bokassa from power known as Operation Barracuda when the Emperor was on an official trip in Libya. David Dacko was re-instated as President of CAR and Bokassa was later offered asylum in France. In October 1979, French Newspaper, Le Canard enchaîné ran a piece stating that President Giscard had accepted two diamonds while Minister of Finance in 1973 by Bokassa. The scandal became known as the Diamonds Affair (Affaire des diamants).

For the next 19 years,  France would intervene in Central African politics by supporting and removing Central African Presidents. In 1997, Central African President Ange-Félix Patassé negotiated the Bangui Agreements to bring an end to the 1990s conflict between government and rebel forces. As a result of the agreements, France closed its military base in Bouar in 1998.

21st century 

In March 2009, French troops were deployed to Bangui after reports that rebels were taking over the capital to remove President François Bozizé from power. In 2012, civil war erupted in the Central African Republic when mostly Muslim rebels known as Séléka removed President Bozizé from power in 2013, and installed Michel Djotodia as President. After the removal of Bozizé, a mainly Christian rebel group known as Anti-balaka rebelled against the government and Muslim nationals in the country. Séléka and government forces fought against Anti-balaka and targeted Christian nationals in the country. As a result of the religious and ethnic conflict in CAR, France returned to CAR to stop the bloodshed by deploying 1,000 troops and armored vehicles into the country to maintain peace known as Operation Sangaris. French President François Hollande visited French troops in CAR in December 2013. The troops remained in CAR until 2016. President Hollande returned to CAR in May 2016 to oversee the removal of French troops from the country which concluded in October 2016 and met with newly-elected President Faustin-Archange Touadéra.

Aid
In 2014, France contributed €170 million Euros in aid to CAR. This aid money paid for civilian assistance in addition to military expenditure, humanitarian assistance, support of the electoral process, support for the end of the crisis and democratic governance in the country. At the donors' conference in Brussels on 17 November 2016, France announced €85 million in aid over three years, including €15 million for the "Bêkou" fund.

Trade

In 2016, trade between the Central African Republic and France totalled $50 million USD. French multi-national companies such as Air France and Orange S.A. operate in CAR.

Resident diplomatic missions 
 Central African Republic has an embassy in Paris
 France has an embassy in Bangui.

See also
 Françafrique
 Lycée Français Charles de Gaulle

References

 
France
Central African Republic